Ormiston railway station served the village of Ormiston, East Lothian, Scotland, from 1872 to 1933 on the Macmerry Branch.

History 
The station was opened on 1 May 1872 by the North British Railway, although it opened earlier to goods in 1867. On the west side was a loading bank, on the south side was Ormiston Junction signal box, which opened in 1901 and closed in 1956, to the north was the goods yard and further to the north was Ormiston Station Colliery. The station closed to passengers on 3 April 1933.

References 

Disused railway stations in East Lothian
Former North British Railway stations
Railway stations in Great Britain opened in 1872
Railway stations in Great Britain closed in 1925
1872 establishments in Scotland
1925 disestablishments in Scotland